Substantive rights are basic human rights possessed by people in an ordered society and include rights granted by natural law as well as the substantive law. Substantive rights involve a right to the substance of being human (life, liberty, happiness), rather than a right to a procedure to enforce that right, which is defined by procedural law. Substantive rights are contrasted with procedural rights, which are purely formal rules of law that only prescribe how a law ought to be enforced, rather than defining the contents of a law.

See also
 Procedural rights
Substantive equality

References

 

Rights
Human rights by issue